Hokkaido Kushiro Koryo High School (北海道釧路湖陵高等学校, Hokkaidō Kushiro Koryō Kōtō Gakkō) is a high school in Kushiro, Hokkaido, Japan, founded in 1912. Hokkaido Kushiro High School is one of high schools administrated by Hokkaido.

The school is operated by the Hokkaido Prefectural Board of Education.

Notable alumni
Satoshi Kon (今 敏) Film director, Animator, Screenwriter and Manga Artist. representative works: Perfect Blue 『パーフェクトブルー』, Millennium Actress 『千年女優』, Tokyo Godfathers 『東京ゴッドファーザーズ』, Paprika 『パプリカ』, Paranoia Agent 『妄想代理人』
Yukinobu Hoshino (星野 之宣) Manga Artist. representative works: Blue Hole 『ブルー　ホール』, 2001 Nights 『2001夜物語』
Yuki Obata (小畑 友紀) Manga Artist. representative works: We Were There 『僕等がいた』

Address and access
 Address: Midorigaoka 3-1-31, Kushiro, Hokkaido, Japan
 Access: Kushiro Bus - Koryo Kōkō Bus stop (湖陵高校)

External links
Official Website of Hokkaido Kushiro Koryo High School

High schools in Hokkaido
Educational institutions established in 1912
1912 establishments in Japan